The Darkness Gathers is a novel by bestselling author Lisa Unger writing as Lisa Miscione. It is the second book featuring Lydia Strong.

References

External links
 Kirkus Review

2003 American novels
American crime novels
Novels set in Florida
Novels by Lisa Unger
Minotaur Books books